The GT300 may refer to:

 A Super GT car category features Group GT3 and JAF-GT300.
 The GT300 family of graphics processors from Nvidia
 The first-generation General Motors Whirlfire Turbo-power gas turbine engine of 1953